The 2022 Ag-Pro 300 was the ninth stock car race of the 2022 NASCAR Xfinity Series, the 31st iteration of the event, and the third race of the Dash 4 Cash. The race was held on Saturday, April 23, 2022, in Lincoln, Alabama at Talladega Superspeedway, a 2.66 mile (4.28 km) permanent triangle-shaped superspeedway. The Dash 4 Cash in this race is consisted of Brandon Jones, Landon Cassill, A. J. Allmendinger, and Austin Hill, since they were the highest finishing Xfinity regulars after Martinsville Speedway. The race was extended from 113 laps to 124 laps, due to three NASCAR overtime attempts. At race's end, Noah Gragson of JR Motorsports would grab the win, after being able to take the lead on the final restart. This was Gragson's seventh career Xfinity Series win, and his second of the season. To fill out the podium, Jeffrey Earnhardt of Richard Childress Racing and A. J. Allmendinger of Kaulig Racing would finish 2nd and 3rd, respectively. Allmendinger would win the Dash 4 Cash, after finishing ahead of Cassill, Jones, and Hill. 

This was the debut race for Chandler Smith.

Background 
Talladega Superspeedway, nicknamed “Dega”, and formerly named Alabama International Motor Speedway (AIMS), is a motorsports complex located north of Talladega, Alabama. It is located on the former Anniston Air Force Base in the small city of Lincoln. A tri-oval, the track was constructed in 1969 by the International Speedway Corporation, a business controlled by the France Family. As of 2021, the track hosts the NASCAR Cup Series, NASCAR Xfinity Series, NASCAR Camping World Truck Series, and ARCA Menards Series. Talladega is the longest NASCAR oval, with a length of 2.66 miles (4.281 km), compared to the Daytona International Speedway, which is 2.5 miles (4.0 km) long. The total peak capacity of Talladega is around 175,000 spectators, with the main grandstand capacity being about 80,000.

Entry list 

 (R) denotes rookie driver.
 (i) denotes driver who is ineligible for series driver points.

Qualifying 
Qualifying was held on Friday, April 22, at 4:30 PM CST. Since Talladega Superspeedway is a superspeedway, the qualifying system used is a single-car, one-lap system with two rounds. In the first round, drivers have one lap to set a time. The fastest ten drivers from the first round move on to the second round. Whoever sets the fastest time in Round 2 wins the pole. 

It was Earnhardt's first career pole in NASCAR, along with his first at Talladega. It was also the first pole for Larry McReynolds as a crew chief since 2000.

Full qualifying results

Race results 
Stage 1 Laps: 25

Stage 2 Laps: 25

Stage 3 Laps: 74

Standings after the race 

Drivers' Championship standings

Note: Only the first 12 positions are included for the driver standings.

References 

2022 NASCAR Xfinity Series
NASCAR races at Talladega Superspeedway
2022 in sports in Alabama
Ag-Pro 300